William A. Wachenfeld (February 24, 1889 – April 22, 1969) was a justice of the New Jersey Supreme Court from 1946 to 1959.

Biography
Wachenfeld was born in Orange, New Jersey on February 24, 1889. He attended Polytechnic Institute of New York University, from which he received his Bachelor's and Juris Doctor (J.D.)

He married Anne Gilmore Weir on February 26, 1925. He unsuccessfully ran for Governor of New Jersey in the New Jersey gubernatorial election, 1937.

He died on April 22, 1969 in Livingston, New Jersey. He is interred at Rosedale Cemetery in Orange, New Jersey.

See also
List of justices of the Supreme Court of New Jersey

References

1889 births
1969 deaths
Justices of the Supreme Court of New Jersey
Burials at Rosedale Cemetery (Orange, New Jersey)
People from Orange, New Jersey
Polytechnic Institute of New York University alumni
20th-century American judges